Simon Wilkinson (born Simon John Wilkinson, 2 February 1972, Worthing, Sussex) is a British ambient musician and composer mainly working in the fields of music for film, television and documentary. He also works under the production name 'The Blue Mask' or 'Thebluemask'.

Early career
His musical beginnings include working with Canadian singer songwriter Mike Bennett on a series of musical and song collaborations starting in 2002 with studio demos for a number of Bennett's songs (under the name Mr Bennett). That same year, Wilkinson also began working with Brighton-based Northern Irish singer songwriter Brian Bell under the name Maritime/Maritime Hotel (a changing collective of Brighton musicians headed by Bell). These initial Maritime recording sessions attracted interest from BBC radio culminating in several live sessions and radio interviews.

After focusing more heavily on film and television soundtrack production work for the next few years, one of his first commercial musical scores was the soundtrack to the 2004 independent film The Club directed by Tony Balogun and starring Treva Etienne.

Recent works
Wilkinson continues to write and record music for television and film productions. His style of film music is often described as heavily texturally based, combining complex atmospheric ambient soundscapes with often simple melodic structures which attempt to mirror the narrative of the visuals; his score to Peter Matsoukas' The Intersection was described by Microfilmmaker magazine as "compelling music that makes you want to get to the bottom of the mystery at hand". His arrangements often involve the use of orchestral and percussive instrumentation combined with electronic sounds as well as more traditional acoustic instruments and piano.

Other feature film scores include his soundtrack to Eric Omani's dark 2007 thriller Spare Change and his contributions to the soundtrack of Modern Life's 2004 martial arts action feature film Left For Dead. He has also written music for several Canadian TV commercials as well as providing production music for TV shows and trailers including Sky One's Football icon and Fox Network's 24 starring Kiefer Sutherland.

In 2011, he wrote the music for Randy Halverson's astronomy time lapse film Plains Milky Way which gathered features on Wired and National Geographic.

His music since this time has focused largely on the Space music genre including long-form atmospheric instrumental pieces and science-fiction soundtracks.

Discography

Studio albums

Compilations

Awards

Angel Film Award
Monaco International Film Festival
 Won: Best Original Music 2010: 'First Darkness'

Gold Medal for Excellence in Music
Park City Film Music Festival
 Won: Gold Medal for Excellence in Music for a Documentary Film 2011 for the film 'Evolution: The Grand Experiment Episode 1'

Personal life
Wilkinson currently resides and works in Worthing, England.

References

External links

English composers
Living people
1972 births